The Soyuz-M (meaning "Union"), GRAU index 11A511M was a Soviet expendable carrier rocket designed by OKB-1 and manufactured by State Aviation Plant No. 1 in Samara, Russia. It was originally built to launch crewed Soyuz 7K-VI spacecraft for the Soviet armed forces. Following the cancellation of this programme, development of the rocket continued for the Soyuz 7K-S spacecraft. After this too was cancelled, Soyuz-M development was also abandoned, and the rockets that had been completed were used to launch reconnaissance satellites.

While the exact details of the Soyuz-M are not known, it is believed to be a two-stage rocket, derived from the Soyuz. It may have been similar to the later Soyuz-U. Following the cancellation of the Soyuz 7K-S, eight were launched with Zenit-4MT spacecraft. The first of these launches occurred on 27 December 1971, and the last on 31 March 1976. All launches occurred from the Plesetsk Cosmodrome, six from pad 41/1 and two from pad 43/4.

References

1971 in spaceflight
1976 in spaceflight
R-7 (rocket family)
Space launch vehicles of the Soviet Union
Vehicles introduced in 1971